The Taim Ecological Station is a federally-administered ecological station in the state of Rio Grande do Sul, Brazil.

Location

It is administered by the Chico Mendes Institute for Biodiversity Conservation.
Taim Ecological Station is located in part of the Rio Grande and Santa Vitória do Palmar municipalities, in the southern state of Rio Grande do Sul, Brazil.
The station is located in a narrow land strip between the Atlantic Ocean and the Lagoon Mirim.  
The BR-471 road crosses the reserve in the longitudinal direction, where the entrance to the ecological station is located.

Environment

The coastal plateau in Rio Grande do Sul features areas of great value in the environment of the extreme south of Brazil and has formed as a result of the advance and retreat of the sea.  
The Taim wetlands contains diverse ecosystems, in lagunal and marine beaches, lagoons, swamps, grasslands and dune ranges and fields.
Due to its diverse ecosystems, many species of animals, such as rufous hornero, turtles, tuco-tucos, capybaras, coypus, broad-snouted caimans and a considerable number of birds are found here.
The flora is also very diverse, featuring Ficus, Erythrina crista-galli, Tibouchina, orchids, Bromelia, cacti, rushes and water hyacinths.

Conservation

The Ecological Station was a "strict nature reserve" under IUCN protected area category Ia.
The purpose is to conserve nature and support scientific research.

References

Sources

External links
Protected Planet - Taim Ecological Station - map and images.
Birding Site Guide: MERÍN LAGOON & TAIM ECOLOGICAL STATION

Ecological stations of Brazil
Protected areas of Rio Grande do Sul
Wetlands of Brazil
Landforms of Rio Grande do Sul
Protected areas established in 1986
1986 establishments in Brazil
Ramsar sites in Brazil